Do Not Disturb (a.k.a.: Silent Witness) is an English-Language Dutch / German mystery film directed, written, produced and composed by Dick Maas. Maas produced it with Laurens Geels. The English-language film stars William Hurt, Jennifer Tilly and Denis Leary.

Summary 
American pharmaceutical executive Walter Richmond (William Hurt) takes a business trip to Amsterdam, accompanied by his wife Cathryn (Jennifer Tilly) and their 10-year-old daughter Melissa (Francesca Brown), who has been mute ever since an accident years before. To communicate, Melissa uses a small magic marker board that she wears around her neck.

Melissa makes a trip to the ladies' room at the hotel De L'Europe and gets separated from her parents. She wanders out of the hotel and onto the street, where Melissa witnesses the execution of Simon Van der Molen (David Gwillim), the attorney representing Walter's Dutch client.

Melissa is spotted by the killers — hit man Bruno Decker (Corey Johnson) and his employer, Rudolph Hartman (Michael Chiklis), who turns out to be Walter's client.

Hartman had Van Der Molen killed to prevent Van Der Molen from revealing the side effects of Hartman's new medication, which he's marketing to Walter's firm. If Van Der Molen would have told Walter about the side effects, Walter would have declined the medication, and Hartman would have been out of a chance to make a lot of money.

Melissa finds temporary refuge with a homeless man named Simon (Denis Leary), then eludes Hartman by stealing a police car, which she promptly smashes into a bistro because she doesn't know how to drive.

Melissa is reunited with her parents at the hotel, but Walter innocently reveals to Hartman his daughter's recent adventures and whereabouts. Hartman tells Decker where Melissa is, and Decker pursues her from her room, down an elevator shaft, and into the suite of rock star Billy Boy Manson, an obvious parody of Marilyn Manson, (Michael A. Goorjian), who tries to sexually assault Melissa. But before Manson can do anything to Melissa, Decker arrives and kills Manson for getting in his way.

Having escaped Billy Boy's clutches, Melissa eludes Decker by climbing out onto a ledge and plunging into the canal below. But Melissa isn't even safe in an ambulance: after Decker is killed, Hartman carjacks the ambulance and drives off. Melissa is rescued, and Hartman is killed when the ambulance crashes.

Cast 
 William Hurt as Walter Richmond
 Jennifer Tilly as Cathryn Richmond
 Denis Leary as Simon
 Francesca Brown as Melissa Richmond
 Michael Chiklis as Rudolph Hartman
 Corey Johnson as Bruno Decker
 Jason Merrells as Chris Mulder
 Michael A. Goorjian as Billy Boy Manson
 David Gwillim as Simon Van der Molen

External links 
 
 

1999 films
1990s horror thriller films
Dutch horror thriller films
Films directed by Dick Maas
Films set in the Netherlands
English-language Dutch films
Films set in hotels
1990s English-language films